M'Bahiakro is a town in east-central Ivory Coast. It is a sub-prefecture of and the seat of M'Bahiakro Department in Iffou Region, Lacs District. M'Bahiakro is also a commune.

In 2014, the population of the sub-prefecture of M'Bahiakro was 49,888.

Villages
The 43 villages of the sub-prefecture of M'Bahiakro and their population in 2014 are:

References

Sub-prefectures of Iffou
Communes of Iffou